Ubiquitin carboxyl-terminal hydrolase 16 is an enzyme that in humans is encoded by the USP16 gene.

This gene encodes a deubiquitinating enzyme that is phosphorylated at the onset of mitosis and then dephosphorylated at the metaphase/anaphase transition. It can deubiquitinate H2A, one of two major ubiquitinated proteins of chromatin, in vitro and a mutant form of the protein was shown to block cell division. Alternate transcriptional splice variants, encoding different isoforms, have been characterized.

References

Further reading